Greentown is a village in Greene Township, Pike County, Pennsylvania, United States. It had a population of 4,526 in the 2000 US Census.

Greentown is home to the Ledgedale Recreational Area and parts of Lake Wallenpaupack.  It is served by the Wallenpaupack Area School District.

Housing 
Housing in the village is mostly restricted to communities, including: The Escape, Lake Paupack Club, Tanglwood Lakes, Paupack Hills, White Pines, Tranquility Falls, Sand Spring Acres, and Lake Wallenpaupack Estates (not to be confused with Wallenpaupack Lake Estates in Wayne County, Pennsylvania).

References

External links
[ The Escape Property Owners Association]
[ Lake Wallenpaupack Estates]

Unincorporated communities in Pike County, Pennsylvania
Unincorporated communities in Pennsylvania